This is a list of holidays in Saint Vincent and the Grenadines.

(2016 dates)
 January 1: New Year's Day
 March 14: National Heroes' Day, honors Chief Joseph Chatoyer on the anniversary of his death in 1795.
 Good Friday (varies each year)
 Easter Monday (varies each year)
 May 1: Labour Day
 Whit Monday (varies each year)
 First Monday in July: Carnival Monday
 Day after Carnival Monday: Carnival Tuesday
 August 1: Emancipation Day, commemorates the liberation of slaves, 1834.
 October 27: Independence Day, from the UK in 1979.
 December 25: Christmas Day 
 December 26: Boxing Day

References 

 
Saint Vincent and the Grenadines